Club Deportivo Tedeón Escuela de Fútbol is a Spanish football team based in Navarrete in the autonomous community of La Rioja. Founded in 1947, it plays in Regional Preferente.

Season to season

2 seasons in Tercera División

External links
Official Website  
frfutbol.com profile
Futbolme.com profile 

Football clubs in La Rioja (Spain)
Association football clubs established in 1947
Divisiones Regionales de Fútbol clubs
1947 establishments in Spain